Sha Guoli (born 30 August 1960) is a Chinese former basketball player who competed in the 1988 Summer Olympics.

References

1960 births
Living people
Chinese men's basketball players
Olympic basketball players of China
Basketball players at the 1988 Summer Olympics
Asian Games medalists in basketball
Basketball players at the 1986 Asian Games
Asian Games gold medalists for China
Medalists at the 1986 Asian Games